The men's 1000 metres race of the 2014–15 ISU Speed Skating World Cup 4, arranged in the Thialf arena in Heerenveen, Netherlands, was held on 13 December 2014.

Pavel Kulizhnikov of Russia won, followed by Kjeld Nuis of the Netherlands in second place, and Hein Otterspeer of the Netherlands in third place. Pim Schipper of the Netherlands won Division B.

Results
The race took place on Saturday, 13 December, with Division B scheduled in the morning session, at 10:24, and Division A scheduled in the afternoon session, at 17:21.

Division A

Division B

References

Men 1000
4